Specific developmental disorders (SDD) was a classification of disorders characterized by delayed development in one specific area or areas. Specific developmental disorders were contrasted to pervasive developmental disorders which were characterized by delays in the development of multiple basic functions including socialization and communication.

ICD-10 taxonomy
The tenth revision of the International Statistical Classification of Diseases and Related Health Problems (ICD-10) has four categories of  developmental disorders: specific developmental disorders of speech and language, specific developmental disorders of scholastic skills, specific developmental disorder of motor function, and mixed specific developmental disorder.

DSM-III taxonomy
In the third edition of the Diagnostic and Statistical Manual of Mental Disorders (DSM-III), SDD was opposed to the pervasive developmental disorders (PDD). There were two factors that were considered:
 The specificity of the impairment: in SDD there is one single domain that is affected, whereas in PDD multiple areas of functioning are affected.
 The nature of the impairment: development in SDD is delayed but not otherwise abnormal, whereas in PDD there are behavioral deviations that are not typical for any developmental stage.
In the DSM-IV, specific developmental disorders were no longer grouped together. Instead they were reclassified as communication disorders, learning disorders, and motor skills disorders.

Comparison and conditions

See also
 Developmental disability
 Global developmental delay

References

External links

Learning disabilities
Special education
Specific developmental disorders